Sidney Baxter Barham (May 31, 1838 – September 20, 1915) was an American physician and Democratic politician who represented Surry and Prince George counties in the  Virginia House of Delegates.

Early and family life

Born to the former Rebecca Ann Price Bell and her farmer husband Thomas B. Barham (1804-1885) in Surry County in 1838, his family included his sister, grandmother and three hired hands but no slaves in 1850. Sidney Barham received a private education, attending the Medical College of Virginia and the medical department of Hampden-Sydney College graduating in 1861, and became a physician. On February 5, 1863, he married Hannah Ann Davis (1839- ); daughter of John Lane Davis and his wife Sarah, who could trace her descent to Revolutionary war patriot Lt. James Davis Jr. They had son Thomas Barham the following year, followed by daughter Virginia Barham in 1866.

Career

Surry county voters twice elected Barham to the Virginia House of Delegates, serving from 1893 to 1897, and was later  in 1903 selected to fill a vacancy.
He died in 1915 and the Norfolk Times Herald published an obituary on September 21, 1915,
His son, Sidney Baxter, Jr., an active Democrat and Surry's postmaster beginning in 1902, represented the same constituency in the House of Delegates during the 1906 and 1910 General Assembly sessions and was later elected to the Virginia Senate.

References

External links

1838 births
1915 deaths
Democratic Party members of the Virginia House of Delegates
People from Halifax, Virginia
20th-century American politicians